Blake Joseph Lizotte (born December 13, 1997) is an American professional ice hockey forward who currently plays for the Los Angeles Kings of the National Hockey League (NHL).

Playing career
After going undrafted out of high school, Lizotte played in the United States Hockey League (USHL) for the Fargo Force from the 2015–16 season to the 2016–17 season. He then committed to play collegiate hockey at St. Cloud State University of the National Collegiate Hockey Conference (NCHC).

In two seasons he helped lead the Huskies to the National Collegiate Hockey Conference (NCHC) regular-season championship in both years and helped secure the top overall seed in the NCAA Tournament. In his sophomore season in 2018–19, Lizotte ranked second on his team in points, tied for first in assists and fourth in goals. He was named to the NCHC First All-Star Team. Over the course of his two seasons in St. Cloud he tallied 69 points 76 games.

After suffering a second consecutive early exit with the Huskies at the NCAA Tournament, Lizotte agreed to a three-year, entry-level contract with the Los Angeles Kings on April 2, 2019. He immediately joined the Kings to conclude the 2018–19 season, making his debut in the Kings' season finale, a 5–2 victory over the Vegas Golden Knights on April 6, 2019. Lizotte scored his first career NHL goal and added an assist in a 3–2 loss to the Montreal Canadiens on November 9, 2019.

After scoring 10 points and leading the Kings in plus-minus rating during the 2020-21 season, Lizotte agreed to a one-year, $800,000 contract extension with the Kings on June 24, 2021. He re-signed a two-year contract extension with an average annual value of $1.675 million with the Kings on March 21, 2022.

Personal life
Lizotte grew up in Lindstrom, Minnesota. His father died when Blake was 14, leaving his mother to raise him and his two brothers on her own.

Career statistics

Awards and honors

References

External links
 

1997 births
Living people
American men's ice hockey centers
Fargo Force players
Los Angeles Kings players
Ontario Reign (AHL) players
People from Chisago County, Minnesota
St. Cloud State Huskies men's ice hockey players
Undrafted National Hockey League players
AHCA Division I men's ice hockey All-Americans